MNL is an acronym that may refer to:

 Ninoy Aquino International Airport, in Pasay, Philippines
 Myanmar National League, a Burmese professional football league
 Municipalities in the Netherlands
 Manila, Philippines